La Bandera is a Caracas Metro station on Line 3. It was opened on 18 December 1994 as part of the inaugural section of Line 3 from Plaza Venezuela to El Valle. The station is between Los Símbolos and El Valle.

References

Caracas Metro stations
1994 establishments in Venezuela
Railway stations opened in 1994